Aidan is a masculine given name.

Aidan or Aiden may also refer to:

 Aidan of Ferns (6th–7th century), Irish bishop and saint
 Aidan of Lindisfarne (died 651), Irish monk and missionary
 Dakhil Aidan, Mandaean priest from Iraq
 Pamela Aidan, pen name of American fiction writer Pamela Mogen (born 1953)
 "Aidan" (The Inside episode)
 Aiden, an American punk rock band

See also
 St. Aidan's (disambiguation) 
 Aydın, a city in and the seat of Aydın Province in Turkey's Aegean Region.
 Aodhan (singer), an Australian indie musician